Chérif Abdeslam (in kabyle: Crif Σebdesslam) (born 1 September 1978 in Hussein Dey, Algiers) is an Algerian retired football player.

He has previously played for IR Husseïn Dey and NA Husseïn Dey, JS Kabylie and USM Annaba.

International career
Abdeslam has eight caps for the Algerian national team with the latest coming against Uruguay in August 2009.

Honours
 Won the Algerian Ligue Professionnelle 1 twice:
 Once with JS Kabylie in 2008
 Once with ASO Chlef in 2011
 Has 8 caps for the Algerian National Team

External links
 DZFoot Profile
 JS Kabylie Profile

1978 births
Living people
People from Hussein Dey (commune)
Kabyle people
Algerian footballers
JS Kabylie players
NA Hussein Dey players
USM Annaba players
Algeria international footballers
ASO Chlef players
Algerian Ligue Professionnelle 1 players
Association football midfielders
21st-century Algerian people